Quantum Aspects of Life, a book published in 2008 with a foreword by Roger Penrose, explores the open question of the role of quantum mechanics at molecular scales of relevance to biology. The book contains chapters written by various world-experts from a 2003 symposium and includes two debates from 2003 to 2004; giving rise to a mix of both sceptical and sympathetic viewpoints. The book addresses questions of quantum physics, biophysics, nanoscience, quantum chemistry, mathematical biology, complexity theory, and philosophy that are inspired by the 1944 seminal book What Is Life? by Erwin Schrödinger.

Contents
 Foreword by Roger Penrose
Section 1: Emergence and Complexity
 Chapter 1: "A Quantum Origin of Life?" by Paul C. W. Davies
 Chapter 2: "Quantum Mechanics and Emergence" by Seth Lloyd
Section 2: Quantum Mechanisms in Biology
 Chapter 3: "Quantum Coherence and the Search for the First Replicator" by Jim Al-Khalili and Johnjoe McFadden
 Chapter 4: "Ultrafast Quantum Dynamics in Photosynthesis" by Alexandra Olaya-Castro, Francesca Fassioli Olsen, Chiu Fan Lee, and Neil F. Johnson
 Chapter 5: "Modeling Quantum Decoherence in Biomolecules" by Jacques Bothma, Joel Gilmore, and Ross H. McKenzie
Section 3: The Biological Evidence
 Chapter 6: "Molecular Evolution: A Role for Quantum Mechanics in the Dynamics of Molecular Machines that Read and Write DNA" by Anita Goel
 Chapter 7: "Memory Depends on the Cytoskeleton, but is it Quantum?" by Andreas Mershin and Dimitri V. Nanopoulos
 Chapter 8: "Quantum Metabolism and Allometric Scaling Relations in Biology" by  Lloyd Demetrius
 Chapter 9: "Spectroscopy of the Genetic Code" by Jim D. Bashford and Peter D. Jarvis
 Chapter 10: "Towards Understanding the Origin of Genetic Languages" by Apoorva D. Patel
Section 4: Artificial Quantum Life
 Chapter 11: "Can Arbitrary Quantum Systems Undergo Self-Replication?" by Arun K. Pati and Samuel L. Braunstein
 Chapter 12: "A Semi-Quantum Version of the Game of Life" by Adrian P. Flitney and Derek Abbott
 Chapter 13: "Evolutionary Stability in Quantum Games" by Azhar Iqbal and Taksu Cheon
 Chapter 14: "Quantum Transmemetic Intelligence" by Edward W. Piotrowski and Jan Sładkowski
Section 5: The Debate
 Chapter 15: "Dreams versus Reality: Plenary Debate Session on Quantum Computing" For panel: Carlton M. Caves, Daniel Lidar, Howard Brandt, Alexander R. Hamilton; Against panel: David K. Ferry, Julio Gea-Banacloche, Sergey M. Bezrukov, Laszlo B. Kish; Debate chair: Charles R. Doering; Transcript Editor: Derek Abbott.
 Chapter 16: "Plenary Debate: Quantum Effects in Biology: Trivial or Not?" For panel: Paul C. W. Davies, Stuart Hameroff, Anton Zeilinger, Derek Abbott; Against panel: Jens Eisert, Howard M. Wiseman, Sergey M. Bezrukov, Hans Frauenfelder; Debate chair: Julio Gea-Banacloche; Transcript Editor: Derek Abbott.
 Chapter 17: "Non-trivial Quantum Effects in Biology: A Skeptical Physicist’s View" Howard M. Wiseman and Jens Eisert
 Chapter 18: "That’s Life! — The Geometry of  Electron Clouds" Stuart Hameroff

See also

 Quantum biology

References

External links
 Book's homepage at ICP

2008 non-fiction books
Biology books
Biophysics
Mathematical and theoretical biology
Popular physics books
Quantum biology
Books by Paul Davies